Kristopher Marshall (born 11 April 1973) is an English actor, starring in films, television and on stage for more than 20 years. He has played Nick Harper in My Family, Colin Frissell in the 2003 film Love Actually, Gratiano in The Merchant of Venice, and Dave in the first series of Citizen Khan (2012). He played DI Humphrey Goodman in Death in Paradise from 2014 to 2017 and reprised the role in Beyond Paradise in 2023.

Early life
Kristopher Marshall was born on 11 April 1973 in Bath, Somerset. His father was a Royal Air Force navigator, whose career included a posting to the Queen's Flight, eventually becoming a squadron leader. Marshall moved with his family to Hong Kong and later to Canada. Upon their return to England, he was educated at Wells Cathedral School as a boarding pupil. After failing his initial A-levels in his first year of sixth form, he enrolled at the Redroofs Theatre School in Maidenhead, Berkshire.

Career
Marshall made an early career appearance on the police series The Bill but it was in 2000 that his major breakthrough role came as Nick Harper in the BBC sitcom My Family. In 2003, he appeared in the film Love Actually as Colin Frissell, an Englishman who goes to Milwaukee, Wisconsin, in the United States to find love. In 2004, Marshall appeared as DS Luke Stone in the police drama series Murder City. From 2005 to 2011, Marshall appeared on TV and in print for BT Retail adverts, where he played the character Adam; with Esther Hall portraying his character's eventual wife Jane. He also played The Ginger Dave in the BBC comedy series Citizen Khan in 2012 but left after season 1.

Since departing his full-time role in My Family in 2003, Marshall made guest appearances three times appearing in 2 episodes of season five in 2004 and his final appearance in a short Comic Relief special in 2005. He finished working on the film Heist at the end of 2006, which aired in April 2008 on BBC Four. During the summer of 2008, Marshall appeared at Trafalgar Studios in the first UK run of Neil LaBute's play Fat Pig. He became a regular cast-member, playing the character of Ethan on the series Traffic Light in 2011.

In April 2013, it was announced that Marshall would be joining the cast of BBC drama Death In Paradise as the island's new lead detective, DI Humphrey Goodman. His character was introduced in the first episode of the third series which aired in 2014, with his first case being to solve the murder of his predecessor, DI Richard Poole (played by Ben Miller). In January 2017 it was leaked that Marshall would be leaving the series citing the pressures it placed upon his family and that he would be replaced by Ardal O'Hanlon who plays DI Jack Mooney.

Marshall starred as Tom Sanger in the 2015 independent British romantic comedy Sparks & Embers.

Marshall reprised the role of DI Humphrey Goodman from Death in Paradise in a BBC spin-off Beyond Paradise, set in Devon, which aired in February 2023.

Filmography

Film, television, and radio

Theatre

Music video
 Chicane No More I Sleep

Awards
 2002 – British Comedy Awards – Best Newcomer

Personal life
Marshall married Hannah Dodkin in 2012. They have lived in Bath with their son, Thomas and daughter, Elsie since 2014. Previously they had lived in the Long Barton area of Wells.

Marshall was hit by a car in Bristol in 2008. The crash happened in the early hours of 28 April as he enjoyed a night out with friends in Bristol city centre. He was taken to Bristol Royal Infirmary, where a scan revealed head injuries. He made a full recovery and began his performances in the play Fat Pig three weeks later as scheduled. Marshall passionately supports Aston Villa F.C. and has said that a card from the club helped him through his recovery.

In October 2011, Marshall was charged with failing to provide a breath test after police stopped his car in the Tesco car park in Wells. Marshall had failed a breath test at the scene, and then refused to provide a second sample at the police station. He pleaded guilty and was disqualified from driving for six months.

References

External links
 
 BBC Comedy profile

1973 births
Living people
Male actors from Somerset
People from Bath, Somerset
People educated at Wells Cathedral School
British expatriates in Hong Kong
English expatriates in Canada
People educated at Redroofs Theatre School
English male film actors
English male stage actors
English male television actors
English male Shakespearean actors
20th-century English male actors
21st-century English male actors